The Men's Javelin Throw event at the 2007 World Championships in Athletics took place on August 31, 2007 (qualification round) and 2 September 2007 (final round) at the Nagai Stadium in Osaka, Japan. There were a total number of 36 competing athletes from 22 countries.

Medalists

Schedule
All times are Japan Standard Time (UTC+9)

Abbreviations

Records

Qualification

Group A

Group B

Final
Field reduced to top eight are three throws, with top eight entitled to a further three attempts.

References
Official results, qualification - IAAF.org
Official results, final - IAAF.org
Event report - IAAF.org

Javelin throw
Javelin throw at the World Athletics Championships